Nicholas Philip Zito (born February 6, 1948, in New York City, New York) is an American Thoroughbred horse trainer.

Zito began his career as a hot walker and worked his way up to a groom, to an assistant trainer, and to a trainer. His first top level horse was Thirty Six Red with which he won the 1990 Grade 1 Wood Memorial Stakes and earned a second-place finish in that year's Belmont Stakes. Nick Zito went on to win the Preakness once, and the Kentucky Derby and Belmont Stakes twice. He got his big break in 1991 when he won his first Kentucky Derby on Strike the Gold.

He was inducted into the National Museum of Racing and Hall of Fame in 2005, a year that his stable won more than $8 million in purses. Zito has also trained the 1996 U.S. Champion2-Year-Old Filly Storm Song as well as Bird Town who was voted the 2003 U.S. Champion 3-Year-Old Filly.

Nick Zito is a National Spokesperson and Honorary Director of the National Horse Protection Coalition. Zito and his wife, Kim, advocates for the just treatment of horses and are involved with the Thoroughbred Retirement Foundation.

Other Graded stakes race wins (partial list):
 Blue Grass Stakes : 1991, 1998, 2004
 Brooklyn Handicap (2001, 2006)
 Champagne Stakes : 1998, 1999, 2000, 2003, 2007
 Florida Derby : 2005, 2010, 2011
 Jockey Club Gold Cup : 2000
 Kentucky Oaks : 2003
 Pimlico Special Handicap : 1992, 1996
 Wood Memorial Stakes : 1990, 1999, 2005

References

External links
 Official Website
 Interview
 Nick Zito at the NTRA
 Nicholas Zito at the United States' National Museum of Racing and Hall of Fame
 

American horse trainers
United States Thoroughbred Racing Hall of Fame inductees
Sportspeople from New York City
Sportspeople from Saratoga Springs, New York
1948 births
Living people